Abu Abdallah Mohammed ibn Abdessalam ibn Nasir (died 1824) was a Moroccan writer. He was a leading scholar at the beginning of the 19th century belonging to the sufi order of the Nasiris. He is the author of two rihlas (travel accounts). Among the other works he wrote is Al-Mazaya fi-ma hudditha min al-bida'a bi-Umm al-Zawaya (The merits of what is told of heresies among the mother of zawiyas). Ibn Abdessalam Ben Nasir functioned in many ways like an ambassador of the Moroccan sultan Mulay Selimanto the intellectual world of the Middle East.

References

Moroccan writers
Moroccan travel writers
1824 deaths
Moroccan diplomats
19th-century Moroccan people
18th-century Moroccan people
Year of birth missing

ca:Abd-al-Qàdir al-Fassí